The 2009 Le Mans Series was the sixth season of Automobile Club de l'Ouest's Le Mans Series.  It was contested over five events between 5 April and 13 September 2009.

Aston Martin Racing trio Jan Charouz, Tomáš Enge and Stefan Mücke finished every race on the podium en route to the LMP1 championship. In LMP2, the pro-amateur pairing of Olivier Pla and Miguel Amaral won the title, with two class wins. Yann Clairay and Patrice Goueslard shared the honours in GT1, driving for former skier Luc Alphand's team. In the tightest battle out of the classes, Marc Lieb and Richard Lietz took GT2 honours by a single point ahead of JMW Motorsport pairing Rob Bell and Gianmaria Bruni.

Schedule
On 10 October 2008, the Automobile Club de l'Ouest (ACO) announced a preliminary 2009 schedule consisting of five rounds.  The 1000 km of Algarve in Portugal notionally replaced the 1000 km of Monza, while the rest of the events from 2008 remain.  In a first for the Le Mans series, the Algarve ran at night.  A second testing event was added to the schedule later, consisting of two days in April at the Bugatti Circuit in Le Mans, France.

Teams and drivers

LMP1

LMP2

GT1

GT2

Season results
Overall winners in bold.

Championship Standings
Points were awarded to the top 8 finishers in the order of 10-8-6-5-4-3-2-1.  One bonus point was also awarded for winning pole position (denoted by bold).  Cars which failed to complete 70% of the winner's distance were not awarded points.  Drivers who did not drive for at least 45 minutes did not receive points.  Entries which changed an engine prior to the two race minimum were penalized two points, with a four-point penalty for every subsequent engine change.

Teams Championships
The top two finishers in each teams championship earned automatic entry to the 2010 24 Hours of Le Mans.

LMP1 Standings

LMP2 Standings

GT1 Standings

GT2 Standings

Drivers Championships

LMP1 Standings

LMP2 Standings

GT1 Standings

GT2 Standings

References

External links
 Le Mans Series

 
European Le Mans Series seasons
European Le Mans Series
European Le Mans Series